Peddle Thorp is an Australian-based architecture, interior design, and urban planning firm, with offices located in Melbourne, Victoria, in Asia and in the Middle East. The Dubai Aquarium & Underwater Zoo inspired from "The Underwater Paradise" is one of the notable project of Peddle thorp.

Major architectural works
Peddle Thorp has designed some of Australia's landmark buildings including the following major architectural projects:

The firm produced highly innovative design features such as the roof opening at the tennis centre at Melbourne Park, which was one of the first in the world to use this approach; to allow for play in all kinds of weather. The firm's New Zealand branch, established in 1968, has also designed various buildings of note, including the Metropolis in Auckland, and Vodafone on the Park in Wellington.

Criticism
Despite its success, Peddle Thorp was criticised by Norman Day, an architectural critic, for producing buildings of little value. Day's views have been contested by Peddle Thorp's design director, Peter Brook. The dispute reflects a broader tension in architectural circles about its role in the commercial sphere. The dispute was seen publicly when a group of architects opposed Peddle Thorp designed changes to Harold Holt swimming pool in 2007. The dispute lost ground when the original architect Daryl Jackson praised Peddle Thorp's revised designs. The highly successful commercial architect Barry Patten, who designed the Sidney Myer Music Bowl, also faced similar criticism from Day and other critics during his career. He was later seen as one of Australia's greatest architects.

See also

Architecture of Australia

References

External links
Peddle Thorp website.

Architecture firms of Australia
Organisations based in Melbourne
Architecture firms based in Victoria (Australia)